Portland is a locality on the western side of Whangarei Harbour in Northland, New Zealand. Whangarei is about 10 km to the north. Tikorangi is a hill to the west with a summit 161 m above sea level.

The major industry is Portland Cement, which is New Zealand's largest cement manufacturer. It has a specialised loading dock on the harbour, and quarries Tikorangi for lime.

History
The Portland Cement Works, which started on Limestone Island in Whangarei Harbour in 1885, moved to Portland in 1916. The Cement works is now owned by Golden Bay Cement, a division of Fletcher Building.

Dominion Cement built a mile-long pier of disused tram rails in 1913.

The town had a railway station on the North Auckland Line from 1918 to 1975.

Demographics
Portland is in two SA1 statistical areas which cover . The SA1 areas are part of the larger Otaika-Portland statistical area.

Portland had a population of 441 at the 2018 New Zealand census, an increase of 108 people (32.4%) since the 2013 census, and an increase of 42 people (10.5%) since the 2006 census. There were 132 households, comprising 234 males and 204 females, giving a sex ratio of 1.15 males per female, with 114 people (25.9%) aged under 15 years, 75 (17.0%) aged 15 to 29, 219 (49.7%) aged 30 to 64, and 33 (7.5%) aged 65 or older.

Ethnicities were 80.3% European/Pākehā, 39.5% Māori, 5.4% Pacific peoples, 0.7% Asian, and 2.0% other ethnicities. People may identify with more than one ethnicity.

Although some people chose not to answer the census's question about religious affiliation, 62.6% had no religion, 25.2% were Christian, 2.0% had Māori religious beliefs and 0.7% had other religions.

Of those at least 15 years old, 45 (13.8%) people had a bachelor's or higher degree, and 84 (25.7%) people had no formal qualifications. 48 people (14.7%) earned over $70,000 compared to 17.2% nationally. The employment status of those at least 15 was that 180 (55.0%) people were employed full-time, 51 (15.6%) were part-time, and 15 (4.6%) were unemployed.

Education
Portland School is a coeducational contributing primary (years 1–6) school with a roll of  students as of

Notes

Whangarei District
Populated places in the Northland Region